Udari Chamika Warnakulasooriya (born 22 March 1988) is a Sri Lankan actress who appears in Sri Lankan films and television. She is best known for the roles in TV serials such as Bonda Meedum and Pini.

Early life
Udari was born on 22 March 1988 in Negambo. Her father is Greshan Fernando and mother is Chitra Pushpakanthi. He has one elder brother, Chamika Haritha. She is a past pupil of Ave Maria Convent Negombo. Udari was a member of the Western and Eastern bands in school and a member of the Western Folk Band as well. She played several sports in the school and was a member of school's netball team, cricket team, elle team and volleyball team. After school times, she received her degree in child psychology from American College of Higher education.

She is married to Sujith Indeewara Wijeratne, who is a doctor, and the couple has one daughter & son.

Modeling career
In 2003, she won Dance Talent Crown at the Contest Fiesta Beauty Competition, which makes the pathway in modeling career. She contested for the Miss Sri Lanka for Miss World 2007 and became a finalist of the competition. During that event, she won many categories including, Miss Talent, Beautiful Legs, Miss Popular and Miss clearness Face.

In 2015, she contested for the Mrs Sri Lanka for Mrs Globe 2015 and won the competition. During that event, she also won events, such as Mrs Talent, Beautiful Skin, Mrs Elegance and Mrs Popular.

Acting career
Before entering into drama field, she acted in many television commercials such as Holcim and Nestlé. Then she appeared in music videos, one in Daddy's Borukari and then in Sanka Dineth's Adare Oba Ai Hera Giye. She hosted the musical program Juke Box, telecasted in TV Derana. At the age of 21, she made her debut cinema acting through Udayakantha Warnasuriya's film Paya Enna Hiru Se. In the film, she acted opposite to Ranjan Ramanayake.

Udari made her first television appearance through Chandika Senanayake's mega teledrama Bonda Meedum. She played as the main protagonist Sansala along with Saranga Disasekara. The drama gained huge popularity throughout the country and Udari was nominated as most popular actress in many local television award festivals. During the COVID-19 pandemic, the filming of eight films was completed: V. Sivadasan's Deveni Yuddhaya, Bennett Ratnayake's Kavuruvat Dannē Næhæ, Sarath Weerasekara's Sri Siddha, Jackson Anthony's Ekagei Sokari and Devi Sambula, Jayantha Chandrasiri's Miduṇu Viśhvaya, Sanjeewa Pushpakumara's Aasu, Professor Sunil Ariyaratne's film Kshera Sāgaraya Kælambiṇa.

Selected television serials
 Adara Desak
 Ahas Maliga
 Binara Malee
 Bonda Meedum
 Hiddalaya
 Kalu Araliya
 Pini
 Sansararanya Asabada
 Sayuri
 Sihina Piyapath
 Wandana

Filmography

Awards

Sumathi Awards

|-
|| 2011 ||| Bonda Meedum || Most Popular Actress ||

Derana Film Awards

|-
|| 2019 ||| People's vote || Most Popular Actress ||

Raigam Tele'es

|-
|| 2014||| Adara Desak || Most Popular Actress Award || 
|-
|| 2020||| Sansaranya Asabada || Best Actress Award  ||

References

External links
 Gossip of Udari
 Our Family is not broken
 Udari Goes Back To History With Racy Costumes
 Udari Family Trip Photos

Living people
Sri Lankan film actresses
1988 births